Strange Tales was a British digest magazine that produced two issues in 1946. It was published by Utopian Publications of London, and edited by Walter Gillings, who was not credited. Technically these were anthologies, not magazines: Postwar paper shortages meant that new magazines could only be launched after an application process that did not apply to anthologies, so the publisher treated them as anthologies. Its writers included Jack Williamson, Robert Bloch, and Ray Bradbury. The issues, which were not dated, appeared in February and March 1946.  They were both 64 pages long; the first was priced at 1/-; the second at 9d.

Footnotes

References 

Defunct science fiction magazines published in the United Kingdom
Magazines published in London
Magazines established in 1946
Magazines disestablished in 1946
Science fiction magazines established in the 1940s
Science fiction-related magazines